Candyholic may refer to:

Addiction to candy
"Candyholic" (song), a single by Antic Cafe